The Turkey women's national under-17 football team is the national under-17 football team of Turkey and is governed by the Turkish Football Federation.

Current squad 

Head coach:  Aytürk Kıyıcı

Results and fixtures 
 The following is a list of match results in the last 12 months, as well as any future matches that have been scheduled.
 Friendly matches are not included.

 Source: Official match results of Turkey, TFF.org

Individual records

Most capped players 
Players in bold are still active.

Top goalscorers 
Goalscorers with an equal number of goals are ranked in chronological order of reaching the milestone. Bold indicates still active players.

Managers

See also 

 Women's football in Turkey
 Turkey women's national football team
 Turkey women's national under-21 football team
 Turkey women's national under-19 football team

References

External links 
 Turkey women's national under-17 football team at Turkish Football Federation official website

Women's national under-17 association football teams
under-17
Youth football in Turkey